Jason White may refer to:

Entertainment
Jason White (musician, born 1967), American singer-songwriter and multi-instrumentalist
Jason White (musician, born 1973), guitarist for Green Day and Pinhead Gunpowder
Jason White, a fictional character on the animated TV series South Park
Jason White, a fictional character from the 2006 film Superman Returns

Sports
Jason White (American football) (born 1980), former quarterback for the University of Oklahoma football team
Jason White (American racing driver) (born 1979), American racing driver
Jason White (Canadian racing driver) (born 1973), Canadian stock car racing driver
Jason White (footballer, born 1971), English football player
Jason White (footballer, born 1984), English football goalkeeper
Jason White (rugby union) (born 1978), Scottish rugby union player

Other
Jason White (politician) (born 1972), American politician in the Mississippi House of Representatives
Jason Christophe White, American playwright